Metanarsia alphitodes is a moth of the family Gelechiidae. It is found in Algeria, south-eastern Kazakhstan, Turkmenistan, Uzbekistan and Mongolia.

The length of the forewings is 5–7 mm. The forewings are cream, mottled with brown. The hindwings are light grey. Adults are on wing from mid-May to the end of June.

Larvae have been reared from Nitraria species. The species overwinters in the larval stage.

References

Moths described in 1891
Metanarsia